The Duet routine competition of the 2014 European Aquatics Championships was held on 13–16 August.

Results
The technical round was held at 15:00 on 13 August. The free round was held at 10:00 on 14 August. The final was held at 10:00 on 16 August.

Green denotes finalists

References

2014 European Aquatics Championships